Araiofusus colpoicus is a species of sea snail, a marine gastropod mollusk in the family Fasciolariidae, the spindle snails, the tulip snails and their allies.

Description

Distribution
This marine species occurs in the Gulf of California

References

External links
  Callomon P. & Snyder M.A. (2017). A new genus and nine new species in the Fasciolariidae (Gastropoda: Buccinoidea) from southern California and western Mexico. Proceedings of the Academy of Natural Sciences of Philadelphia. 165(1): 55–80

Fasciolariidae
Gastropods described in 1915